Richard N. Luft (born March 14, 1938) was an American politician.

Born in Pekin, Illinois, Luft received his bachelor's degree in political science and his master's degree in public administration from Sangamon State University. From 1975 to 1979, Luft served in the Illinois House of Representatives and was a Democrat. He then served in the Illinois State Senate from 1983 until he resigned in 1993. During his legislative tenure, he served on the central committee for the Democratic Party of Illinois as one of two committee members from what was then Illinois's 18th congressional district with Shirley McCombs. In May 1993, Luft was appointed commissioner of the Illinois Department of Banks and Trust. He was succeeded in the Illinois Senate by then-Peoria County Sheriff George Shadid.

He had unsuccessfully sought the Democratic nomination for Illinois Comptroller in 1978, losing to Roland Burris.

Notes

1938 births
Living people
People from Pekin, Illinois
University of Illinois at Springfield alumni
Democratic Party members of the Illinois House of Representatives
Democratic Party Illinois state senators